Mount Nor' West Station is a pastoral lease in outback South Australia that once operated as a sheep station but is now a cattle station.

History
McConville already owned Myrtle Springs Station and would later acquire Witchelina and Angepena Stations.

The station was acquired by Sidney Kidman at some time before 1899. At this time only a few cattle were being run on the eastern side of the property. In 1908 a flock of 14,053 sheep were shorn at the station. and the size of the station was recorded as being only .

The purchasers were A.S. Toll, E.G. and J.L. Bonython, who had established the Myrtle Springs Pastoral Company.

See also
 List of ranches and stations

References

Stations (Australian agriculture)
Pastoral leases in South Australia
Far North (South Australia)